Alysson triangulifer is a species of wasp in the family Crabronidae. It is found in North America.

Subspecies
These two subspecies belong to the species Alysson triangulifer:
 Alysson triangulifer shawi Bradley, 1920
 Alysson triangulifer triangulifer Provancher, 1887

References

Crabronidae
Articles created by Qbugbot
Insects described in 1887